Jürgen Ahrend (born 28 April 1930) is a German organ builder famous for restoring instruments such as the Rysum organ and the Arp Schnitger organ in St. Jacobi, Hamburg (St James's Church) as well as building original instruments. He is interviewed extensively in the film Martinikerk Rondeau, released in 2009.

Ahrend was born in Göttingen on 28 April 1930. Afterwards, he worked for the firm as employee. They produced 54 new organs and made 19 restorations, until Brunzema left the firm in 1972. Since January 1972, the workshop has been operating under the name Jürgen Ahrend Orgelbau. Since 2005, his son Hendrik Ahrend has run the workshop.

Awards 

 21 May 1986 Niedersachsenpreis for Culture
 19 April 2000 Honorary doctorate from the Monash University, Victoria, Australia
 5 May 2007 The Buxtehude Prize from the city of Lübeck.

Works (selection) 

Roman number = number of manuals
Arabian number = number of stops
P = independent pedal
p = pull down pedal
R = restoration 
Rc = reconstruction
NB = new built

Ahrend & Brunzema (1954–1971)

Jürgen Ahrend (1972–2004)

Hendrik Ahrend (since 2005)

References

Further reading 
 25 Jahre Orgelbau Jürgen Ahrend 1954–1979. Leer-Loga 1979.
 
 
 Fiori gratulatorii Jürgen Ahrend – Organopoeius. Zum 50jährigen Bestehen der Orgelwerkstatt in Leer und Loga dagli amici e ammiratori. Ed. Peter Golon and Harald Vogel. CSW Druckservice, Grasberg 2004.
 Uwe Pape: Jürgen Ahrend and Gerhard Brunzema. In: Organ Yearbook. No. 3, 1972, p. 24–35.

External links 
 
 

German pipe organ builders
1930 births
Living people
Musicians from Göttingen
Musical instrument manufacturing companies of Germany